Michael Reid (born 3 July 1938) is an Irish boxer. He competed in the men's light middleweight event at the 1960 Summer Olympics.

References

1938 births
Living people
Irish male boxers
Olympic boxers of Ireland
Boxers at the 1960 Summer Olympics
Sportspeople from Dublin (city)
Light-middleweight boxers